Eppy may refer to:

EPpy Awards, awarded to the best media-affiliated websites
Bill Eppy, an American soccer player who earned one cap with the U.S. national team in 1957

See also
Epinephrine
Eppie (disambiguation)
Epie (disambiguation)